"The Light That Blinds" is the first track from heavy metal band Shadows Fall's fourth studio album The War Within.

This song is featured in the video game Guitar Hero II.

Song meaning
Brian Fair has stated that, "This song is about how people, TV, and other influences can convince you to be something you are not, and you stay that way because you think it makes you better or more popular, but inside you do not really feel that way and it disguises your true identity."

Personnel
Brian Fair – vocals
Jonathan Donais – lead guitar
Matt Bachand –  rhythm guitar
Paul Romanko – bass
Jason Bittner – drums

References

Shadows Fall songs
2004 songs
2005 singles